is a city located in Kumamoto Prefecture on the island of Kyushu, Japan. The city was founded on August 1, 1958. As of March 31, 2017, the city has an estimated population of 49,455 and a population density of 180 persons per km2.

On March 22, 2005, Kikuchi absorbed the towns of Shichijo and Shisui, and the village of Kyokushi (all from Kikuchi District) to create the new and expanded city of Kikuchi.

Geography

Climate
Kikuchi has a humid subtropical climate (Köppen climate classification Cfa) with hot, humid summers and cool winters. There is significant precipitation throughout the year, especially during June and July.

Demographics
Per Japanese census data, the population of Kikuchi in 2020 is 46,416 people. Kikuchi has been conducting censuses since 1960.

Twin towns – sister cities
Kikuchi is twinned with:
  Nishimera, Miyazaki, Japan
  Gimje, Jeollabuk-do, South Korea (1985)
  Sishui County, Shandong, China (1994)
  Tōno, Iwate, Japan (1998)
  Cheongwon County, Chungcheongbuk-do,  South Korea (2005)

See also
 Kikuchi Shrine

References

External links 

 Kikuchi City official website 

Cities in Kumamoto Prefecture
Populated places established in 1958
1958 establishments in Japan